Medumba phonology is the way in which the Medumba language is pronounced. It deals with phonetics, phonotactics and their variation across different dialects of Medumba.

Segments 
Initial research on the Medumba segment inventory was conducted by Voorhoeve in the early 1960s, and published in Voorhoeve (1965). He identified 15 vowels and 40 consonants. Not described by Voorhoeve (1965) are the plain and pre-nasalized bilabial trills /ʙ/, /ᵐʙ/, which occur most often before central vowels /ʉ, ə/, which brings the total number of consonants to 42.  The following two subsections survey the vowel and consonant inventory.

Vowels 
Medumba has a 10 simplex vowels, and 5 complex vowels (diphthongs).

Simple vowels 
Medumba has 10 phonemic vowels given in the following inventory:

Diphthong vowels 
Medumba has five phonemic diphthongs.

Diphthongs involve a combination of a closed (high) vowel (V1)  /i,ʉ,u/ with a non-closed (non-high) vowel (V2) /a,ə,ɑ/, as follows:
 front  /i/ combines with front or centre  /a/ and /ə/ to form /ia/ and 
 front /i/ does not combine with back /ɑ/, so */iɑ/ is not a possible diphthong
 central  /ʉ/ combines with  front or back  /a/ and /ɑ/  to form /ʉa/ and /ʉɑ/
 central /ʉ/ does not combine with central /ə/; so */ʉə/ is not a possible diphthong
 back  /u/ combines with  back  /ɑ/ to form /uɑ/
 back /u/ does not combine non-back vowels, so */ua/ and */uə/ are not possible diphthongs

Consonants 
The canonical morpheme in Medumba is a single syllable, either an open CV syllable or a closed CVC syllable (Voorhoeve 1965:319). This morpheme structure constraint has consequences for the consonant inventory. Indeed, a notable property of Medumba is that the number of contrastive consonants differs according to whether one considers consonants in onset position (i.e., consonants that begin a CV or CVC syllable) or consonants in coda position (i.e. consonants that end a CVC syllable). Below, the consonant inventory is introduced, and the distributional differences between coda (C2) and onset (C1) consonants are described.

Medumba has 42 consonants, of which 18 are simplex consonants and 24 are complex consonants.

Simplex consonants 
There are 18 simplex consonants in Medumba (Voorhoeve 1965).

Medumba has 18 simple consonants, with three of them (placed in parentheses in the table below) being extremely rare.

Note the absence of the following segments:
 there is a voiced bilabial stop , but no counterpart voiceless bilabial stop *
 but  occurs as an allophone of 
 there is a voiceless palatal fricative  (with limited distribution), but no counterpart voiced palatal fricative *
 but  occurs as an allophone of 
 there are velar nasal and oral stops, but no counterpart velar fricatives * or *
 but  occurs as a release in the ~ alternation, and [x] occurs as a release in the ~ alternation

Complex consonants 
There are 24 complex consonants found in Medumba (Voorhoeve 1965:326, section 3.1.9). Complex consonants only occur in onset position.

Note the following gaps in the inventory of complex consonants:
 no labialized labial nasal or voiceless stop: *, *, *
 no labialized alveolar (nasal or oral) stop: *, *, *,  *, *
 no labialized voiceless labial, palatal or velar fricative: *, *, *, *, *, *

Final consonants 
Of the 40 consonants found in Medumba, only 7 can be coda consonants: the 3 nasal stops , the 3 counterpart voiced oral stops , and the glottal stop .

Final nasals 
Final nasals include bilabial , alveolar , and velar .

Final stops 
Final stops includes bilabial  (with allophone ), alveolar  (with allophones ), velar  (with allophone ), and glottal .

Initial consonants 
The below table presents the inventory of onset consonants and their allophones. The only consonant excluded from onset position is the glottal stop . All other consonants occur in onset position, so  there are 39 possible onset consonants. In onset position, nasals may be plain (C) or labialized (Cʷ). All other consonant types (voiced plosives, voiceless plosives, fricative) occur as plain (C),  labialized (Cʷ), pre-nasalized (ⁿC), or pre-nasalized and labialized (ⁿCʷ). In addition, onset consonants display allophonic variation that is conditioned by the following vowel.

Initial labials 
Initial labials include:
 labialized consonants (Cʷ):  (with allophone )
 pre-nasalized consonants (ⁿC):  and 
 pre-nasalized labialized consonants (ⁿCʷ):

Initial alveolars 

Initial alveolars include:
 plain consonants (C): ,  (with allophone ),  (with allophone ), and 
 labialized consonants (Cʷ): 
 pre-nasalized labialized consonants (ᴺCʷ): 
{| class="wikitable"
|+ Examples of alveolar onsets
|-
| rowspan="4" |C
|nasal
| 
| 
|nà
 L

'field' (V323;3.1.2)
|
|
|-
|stop,
voiced
| 
| 
|dim
 H

'tongue' (V323;3.1.2)
|
|lxxx
  /__[-Closed.V]

'zzz'
|-
|stop,
voiceless
| 
| 
|tu
 tone?

'head'
| 
|tu
 tone?

'to pierce' (Voorhoeve 1966:323)
|-
|fricative
| 
| 
| colspan="3" |sògo
 LH

'to wash' (V323;3.1.2)
|-
|Cʷ
|fricative
| 
| 
| colspan="3" |swá

'broom, tail' (V324;3.1.4)
|-
| rowspan="3" |ᴺC
|stop,
voiced
| 
| 
| colspan="3" |ndəb L
 L(H)

'cotton' (V324;3.1.3)
|-
|stop,
voiceless
| 
| 
|ntɑnə

 HH

'market, business' (V324;3.1.3)
|
|ntxx

{{IPA|[ⁿtʰyyy]}}/__[+Closed]

'zzz'
|-
|fricative
| 
| 
|nsindɑ H!H

'floor' (V324;3.1.3)
| 
|nzxxx /__[-Closed]

'zzz'
|-
|ᴺCʷ
|fricative
| 
| 
| colspan="3" |nswə H

'new' (V325;3.1.5)
|-
| colspan="7" |(adapted from Voorhoeve 1965)
row 1 = orthography; row 2 = [IPA]; row 3 = 'gloss'
|}

 Initial palatals 
Initial palatals include:
 plain consonants (C): ,  (with allophones ,),  (with allophones  and ), and 
 pre-nasalized labialized consonants (ⁿCʷ):  with allophone 
{| class="wikitable"
|+ Examples of palatal onsets
|-
|-
! rowspan=2 | Phoneme
! rowspan=2 | Allophone
! colspan=3 | Example
|-
! Orthography
! IPA
! Gloss
|-
| 
| 
| nyàang|  LH
| 'to dance' (V323;3.1.2)
|-
| rowspan=4 | 
| 
| jənə|  HH
| 'to see' (V323;3.1.2)
|-
| 
|-
| 
|-
| 
|zə|  H __/i/
| 'relative pronoun' (V325; 3.1.6)
|-
| rowspan=3 | 
| 
|tu| 
| 'head' (ref)
|-
| 
|tu| 
| 'to pierce' (Voorhoeve 1966:323)
|-
| 
|-
| 
| 
|-
| 
| 
| nywìi| {{IPA|[ɲʷiiʔ]}} LH
| 'to spoil' (V324;3.1.4)
|-
| rowspan=3 | 
| 
| jwəde LH|  LH
| 'to wet' (V324; 3.1.4)
|-
| 
|-
| 
|-
| rowspan=3 | 
| 
|cwi|  LH
| 'to give a name' (V327,3.3.1)
|-
| 
|shʉmə| ,  HH __ʉ,u
| 'to swing' (V325;3.1.8)
|-
|
|-
| rowspan=3 | 
| 
| nyjiag|  H
| 'mane' (V324;3.1.3)
|-
|
|-
|
|-
| rowspan=3 | 
| 
| ntɑnə|  HH
| 'market, business' (V324;3.1.3)
|-
| 
|-
| 
|-
| rowspan=2 | 
| 
| nyjwi| 
| 'woman' (V325;3.1.5)
|-
| 
|-
| rowspan=2 | 
| 
|-
| 
|-
| colspan="7" |(adapted from Voorhoeve 1965)
|}

 Initial velars 
Initial velars include:
 plain consonants (C): ,  (with allophone ),  (with allophones  and )
 pre-nasalized labialized consonants (ⁿCʷ):  and 

 Phonological processes affecting segments 

 Vowel insertion 
Consonant-final words - which are generally CVC because of the size constraint that favours CV or CVC words - are often augmented by a final vowel. This process of vowel insertion happens in one of two contexts: (i) before a pause; (ii) at the end of a sentence. The quality of the inserted vowel is conditioned by the final consonant: if the final C is a glottal stop, then the inserted vowel is schwa; elsewhere, the inserted vowel is a copy of the stem vowel. Examples illustrating vowel insertion are given in (60).

 (60) a. koo                          b.  cintEE        ko-o                             cin-te-e
        love-FV                          xx-yy-FV
        'to want, to love'               'to urinate'
        (adapted from Voorhoeve 1965:332)

 Consonant mutation 
Consonants in onset position surface with different variants. This consonant allophone, a form of consonant mutation, is conditioned by the following vowel. There are seven conditioning contexts, as follows:
 the non-closed vowels
 the closed vowels
 the high front vowel 
 the high non-front vowels  and 
 the high central (non-front, non-back) vowel 
 the high back vowel 
 the vowels  and 

 Tone 
Medumba is famous for the extent to which tone shapes grammar. Although having only a two-tone contrast, namely High (H) and Low (L), surface tone melodies are conditioned by a variety of lexical, morphological and syntactic factors:

 lexically specified level Low (L) and High (H) tone
 morphologically derived falling (HL) and rising (HL) contour tones
 syntactically conditioned downstep, where H is produced at a lower pitch than a preceding H tone

 Two tones: high versus low 
Medumba is described  as a two-level tone system with low (L) and high (H) tones; examples are given in Table 16. Observe that the L/H contrast is found with all Lexical (open) class categories; this includes verbs, nouns and prepositions. Likewise, Functional (closed-class) categories show an L/H contrasts; this includes verbal F-categories (C, T, and Aspect) and nominal F-categories (Dem, Det, Pl). [Describe examples; also give minimal pairs]

 Tone contrasts with verbs 
Verb stems come in two shapes, CV and CVC, with each one contrasting Low and High tone. See (1-5) for examples of High/Low tone contrast with CV stems, and (6-6) for examples of High/Low tone contrast with CVC stems.

 Tone contrasts with nouns 

{| class="wikitable"
! colspan="10" |High/Low tone contrast with CVC noun stems: (23-29)
|-
! rowspan="2" |
! colspan="4" |Low tone
! colspan="4" |High tone
! rowspan="2" |Source
|-
!
!IPA
!orthography
!gloss
!
!IPA
!orthography
!gloss
|-
|(23)
|L(L)
|[mbàn]
|m-bàn|'rain' (c2)
|H(L)
|[mbán]
|m-ban|'side, c?'
|V1976:111
|-
|(24)
|L(H)
|[bùʔ]
|bù
|'mushroom' (c3/5)
|H(L)
|[búʔ]
|bu
|'package' (c3/6)
|V1976:113
|-
|(25)
|L(H)
|[ɣəʔ]
|ghə
|'cheek' (c3/5)
|H(H)
|
|ghə|'avarice' (c3)
|V1976:117
|-
|(26)
|L(L)
|
|n-tɑn
|'string' (c1)
|H(H)
|
|n-tɑn
|'trade, commerce' (c1)
|V1976:127
|-
|(27)
|L(H)
|
|ŋ-kùn
|'tail' (c2/4)
|H(L)
|
|ŋ-kun
|'rice, beans'
|V1976:121
|-
|(28)
|L(L)
|
|kɑb
|'fence' (c1/4)
|H(L)
|
|ŋ-kɑb
|'money' (c1)
|V1976:119
|-
|(29)
|L(L)
|
|kam
|'piece' (c3/5)
|H(L)
|
|ŋ-kam
|'noble' (c1/4)
|V1976:119
|-
|(30)
|L(H)
|
|cwed
|'the bush'
|L(H)
|
|ncwed
|'chiefancy
|
|-
| colspan="10" |(adapted from Voorhoeve 1976)
|}
In principle, given the possibility of a stem bearing associated with one of four tone melodies — namely L(L), L(H), H(L) and H(H) for nouns and L or H for verbs — one expects to find a four-way tone contrast for a given segmental base (either CV or CVC). No such examples are attested within a given word-class, but there is one instance elf a 4-way contrast across word-classes. In addition, there are a few three-way contrasts for a given noun base, and numerous many four-way tone contrasts with the same base, if one looks at tone melodies across word-classes.
 CV tɔ, which has L(H), H(L) and H(H) stems
 CVC m-vɛd, which has L(L) 
 CVC lɛn, to, and mvdd.
Examples are given in (1-3).

{| class="wikitable"
|+ Noun classes
|-
! rowspan="2" |
! colspan="4" |Low tone
! colspan="4" |High tone
! rowspan="2" |Source
|-
!
!IPA
!orthography
!gloss
!
!IPA
!orthography
!gloss
|-
|(1)
|L(L)
|
|kà
|'sorcellery, magic (c3)
|L(H)
|
|ŋ-kà
|'rank' (c2)
|V1976:119
|-
|(2)
|L(L)
|[kəʔ]
|kə|'tam-tam' (c3/5)
|H(L)
|
|ŋ-kə|'ball'
|V1976:120
|-
|(3)
|L(H)
|
|kɔ
|'arrow" (c3/5)
|L(H)
|
|ŋ-kɔ
|'pilon' (c1/4)
|V1976:121
|-
|(4)
|H
|
|shun
|'friendship (c1/4)
|H(H)
|
|n-shun
|'friend' (c1/4)
|V1976:126
|-
|(5)
|H(H)
|
|tʉ
|1. 'tree' (c3/5)
2. 'up above'
|H(L)
|
|n-tʉ
|'heart' (c/24)
|V1976:129
|-
| colspan="10" |(adapted from Voorhoeve 1976)
|}
 (3)  Low-tone           fù                          (4) High-tone          tʃə́ŋ   
                        [fù]                                                [tʃə́ŋ]
                        'medicine'                                           'food'         
 
 (From Kouankem 2013:60; Mucha 2017: 8)

 Tone contrasts with prepositions 
 (5)  Low-tone    (a)   mbàŋ       [ᵐbàŋ]      (b)   nùm     [nùm]       (c)   ɲàm     [ɲàm]                                                             
                        'next to'                    'on'                      'behind'
 
 (6) High-tone          mʙə́    [ᵐʙə́]
                        'in front of'  (from Hawkes et al. 2015:122)

 Tone contrasts with complementizers 
 (7)  Low-tone    (a)   ndà                        (8) High-tone         mbʉ   
                        [ⁿdà]                                           [ᵐbʉ́]
                        'C'                                              'C'    
 
 (From)

 Tone contrasts with demonstratives 
 (9)  Low-tone    (a)    s-ə̂n                     (10) High-tone         N yə́n   
                        [s-ə̂n]                                           [N  yə́n]
                        AGR-this                                          N    Dem.Dist
                                                                        'that N'    
 
 (Kouankem 2013:60)

 Tone contrasts with plural-marking 
 (11)  Low-tone    (a)   bà   N                    (12) High-tone        ba N 
                        [bà]                                             [bá]
                        'PL'                                            'PL'   
 
 (Kouankem 2013:62)

 Falling and rising tones 
In addition to level high and low tones, Medumba exhibits falling (HL) and rising (LH) contour tones. These contour tones are morphologically derived from  floating H tones that occur as affixes preceding or following the stems they associate with. These floating tones make themselves known by docking to tone-bearing units (TBUs) associated with  L-tone, thus forming a tone contour. [DESCRIBE EXAMPLES; add LH examples]  
 (13)  L-tone verb (put in sentence)
       ghʉ̀ 
       [ɣʉ̀] 
       do
       'do’
 
 
 (14)  Derived HL-tone verb (put in sentence)
       nghʉ̀''''' 
       [N-ɣʉ̀] 
       N-do
       'do, consecutive’
 
 (identify source)

Downstep 
Medumba shows downstep, where H is produced at a lower pitch than an immediately preceding H tone; downstep is represented as (ꜜ). Downstep is viewed as resulting from a floating Low tone that shifts the pitch level of a following High tone one step lower than the preceding High tone. Downstep is syntactically conditioned in that it occurs at phrasal boundaries:
 Downstep occurs between Subject and following Verb,
 Downstep occurs between Verb and following Complement
 Downstep occurs between Noun and following Complement
[GIVE EXAMPLES]

References

Phonologies by language
Bamileke languages